My Prison Without Bars is Pete Rose's autobiography, published by Rodale Press in Emmaus, Pennsylvania on January 8, 2004.

In the book, Rose finally admitted publicly to betting on baseball games and other sports while playing for and managing the Cincinnati Reds. He also admitted to betting on Reds games, but said that he never bet against the Reds.

At the time of its release, excerpts from the book were printed in Sports Illustrated.

References

2004 non-fiction books
Rodale, Inc. books
Sports autobiographies
Major League Baseball books